Social Unity Uprising of September First (in Spanish: Levantamiento de Unidad Social Primero de Septiembre) is a civic political platform in the Bolivian municipality of Achocalla, near La Paz. The group is led by Wenceslao Ochoa. After the December 2004 municipal elections, Ochoa became mayor. Ochoa had been mayor of Achocalla for a brief period in 2000.

Political parties in Bolivia